The Man Who Killed Himself is a 1967 comedy crime novel by the British writer Julian Symons.

Synopsis
Sick of his life with his wealthy but domineering wife, Arthur Brownjohn creates a flamboyant alter ego for himself and enjoys life with his second identity. Pushed too far one day he decides to murder his wife in the disguise of his other persona.

Film adaptation
In 1969 it was adapted into the film Arthur? Arthur! directed by Samuel Gallu and starring Shelley Winters, Donald Pleasence and Terry-Thomas.

References

Bibliography
 Hilfer, Tony. The Crime Novel: A Deviant Genre. University of Texas Press, 2014.
Reymond, Henry & Keating, Fitzwalter. Crime & Mystery: The 100 Best Books. Xanadu, 1987.
 Walsdorf, John J. & Allen, Bonnie J. Julian Symons: A Bibliography. Oak Knoll Press, 1996.

1967 British novels
Novels by Julian Symons
British thriller novels
British crime novels
Novels set in London
British novels adapted into films
Collins Crime Club books